The 2022 CEBL season was the fourth season of the Canadian Elite Basketball League (CEBL). It began on May 25, 2022, and ended on August 1, 2022. There will be play-in games on August 4 where the 5th to 8th seed will compete to play in the playoffs. The playoffs will start on August 6. The Championship weekend will be from August 12 to the 14; the Ottawa Blackjacks will be hosting the event. It is also the inaugural season for the Montreal Alliance, Newfoundland Growlers, and the Scarborough Shooting Stars. The Hamilton Honey Badgers defeated the Scarborough Shooting Stars 90–88, for their first CEBL championship in franchise history. They will represent Canada in the 2022-23 BCL Americas season.

Regular season

Standings

Results

Attendance

Play in round

Play in games

Playoffs

Bracket

Quarter-finals

Championship Weekend

Semi-finals

Final

Awards
Source:
Player of the Year: Khalil Ahmad, Niagara River Lions
Canadian Player of the Year: Caleb Agada, Hamilton Honey Badgers
U Sports Developmental Player of the Year: Thomas Kennedy, Fraser Valley Bandits
Defensive Player of the Year: EJ Onu, Niagara River Lions
Referee of the Year: Jayson Stiell
Clutch Player of the Year: Khalil Ahmad, Niagara River Lions
Coach of the Year: Ryan Schmidt, Hamilton Honey Badgers
6th man of the year: Koby McEwen, Hamilton Honey Badgers
CEBL Final MVP: Christian Vital, Hamilton Honey Badgers

All-CEBL teams

All Canadian team
Source:

Forwards
 Isiaha Mike, Scarborough Shooting Stars
 Jordan Baker, Edmonton Stingers
 Thomas Kennedy, Fraser Valley Bandits

Guards
 Caleb Agada, Hamilton Honey Badgers
 AJ Lawson, Guelph Nighthawks

Statistics

Individual statistic leaders

Notes

References

External links 

Canadian Elite Basketball League
2021–22 in Canadian basketball
CEBL season
Sports in Canada